The national flag of Ghana consists of a horizontal triband of red, gold, and green. It was designed in replacement of the British Gold Coast's Blue Ensign.

The flag was adopted upon the independence of the Dominion of Ghana on March 6, 1957. It was designed the same year by Theodosia Okoh, a renowned Ghanaian artist. The flag was flown until 1964 and it was then reinstated in 1966. The flag of Ghana consists of the Ethiopian Pan-African colours of red, yellow, and green in horizontal stripes with a black five-pointed star in the centre of the gold stripe. The Ghanaian flag was the second African flag after the flag of the Ethiopian Empire to feature these colours, although the colours are inverted. The flag's design influenced that of the flag of Guinea-Bissau (1973).

Design 

The Ghanaian flag was designed as a tricolour following in a sequence of red, gold and green. The colours are a representation of the country's struggle for independence and a symbol of its rich resources within the geographical location of the country among other African countries. The three colours used are quite memorable with a star of the sky designed in a black colour within the centre, taking the centre coverage of the gold colour.

The red colour of the national flag of Ghana was used to represent the blood of forefathers who led the struggle of independence and shared their blood through death. The country's struggle for independence from the United Kingdom took the life of prominent Ghanaian leaders at the time. The names of the big six were Edward Akufo Addo, Dr. Ako Adjei, William Ofori Atta, Joseph Boakye Danquah, Emmanuel Obetsebi Lamptey, and later Osagyefor Dr. Kwame Nkrumah. The big six formed the United Gold Coast Convention (UGCC), an anti-colonialist political party formed to gain Ghanaian independence from British colonial rule. Red also stands for love which might have influenced our forefathers who led the struggles for Ghana's independence for the love of the nation.

The gold colour takes the centre line of the three colours attraction and it represents the mineral resources mostly found in the Ashanti region of Ghana, helping to harness the wealth of the country. The gold is one of Ghana's mineral resources found mostly in Obuasi in Ashanti Region and Tarkwa in the Western Region. The enrichment of the gold resources of Ghana led to the initial name the Gold Coast which was later changed to Ghana of the struggle and success of the attainment of independence in 1957. Ghana's other mineral resources are diamond, bauxite, and manganese.

The green symbolises Ghana's rich forests and natural wealth which provide the nation with oil, food, and cash crops such as cocoa, timber, sheabutter, and all kinds of food products for the country. The green colour till today is used as a symbol of the green vegetations of crop produce in Ghana. Ghana is noted for its cash crop of cocoa which was first brought to Ghana by Tetteh Quarshie from Fernando Po. Most of Ghana's cash crops are exported to overseas countries in exchange for physical cash which is used for the country's development of roads, schools, water, sanitation and industries for employment.

The black star of the Ghanaian national flag is a symbol used to represent the emancipation of Africa and unity against colonialism. The black star was adopted from the flag of the Black Star Line, a shipping line incorporated by Marcus Garvey which operated from 1919 to 1922. and became also known as the Black Star of Africa. It is where the Ghana national football team derive their nickname, the "Black Stars".

Ghana's struggle for independence before the national flag 

Ghana was one of the countries counted among the West African regions under colonial government rule from the 15th to 19th centuries on the Gold Coast. The history of Ghana can therefore be traced back to the 15th century when Europeans arrived in the region. The Portuguese navigators sailed their way down the West African coast and to the shores of the Gold Coast in 1471, where they build a castle for themselves at the Elmina in 1482.  The Europeans brought a gold cargo to the shores of the Gold Coast where they traded in gold with the Akwamus and Denkyiras who controlled an extensive part of the coast and the forest belt in the 17th century.

In the 18th century, the dominance of the Ashanti Empire of Kumasi took over the gold trade with the British, Dutch and Danes who were the main European traders at the Tano and Volta rivers. The most valuable commodity for exports at the time changed from gold to slavery. Slaves were traded for muskets besides other western commodities. The Ashantes by then were locally empowered to take control with the Asantehene enthroned on a golden stool as a tradition of the Ashantes. Between 1804 and 1814, the British, Dutch and Danes subsequently outlawed the slave trade, which proved to be a major blow to the Ashanti economy. The situation became warfare in 1820 and in 1824 and 1870, they were subsequently defeated by British forces who shortly thereafter occupied the region of Kumasi in 1874. The British gradually emerged on the coastal regions as the main European power.

The colonial period started from 1902 to 1957. The Ashante Kingdom in 1902 was declared a British crown colony and became the protectorate of the northern territory of the Gold Coast. The colonial government ruled the colony without the involvement of the African populace in the political process. After World War II, the Gold Coast colony became prominent among the Sub-Saharan African countries. It was when Osagyefo Dr. Kwame Nkrumah had returned to the Gold Coast in 1947 after twelve years of political study in the US and Great Britain. The return to the Gold Coast was an invitation for Osagyefo Dr. Kwame Nkrumah to lead the United Gold Coast Convention (UGCC) as the General Secretary with the aim to lead the campaign for self government. The UGCC at the time had won the right of the African majority in the British legislative colony. With the leadership of Kwame Nkrumah, a widespread riot began in February 1948.

Within the same year, the founding leaders of the UGCC arrested the Secretary General Dr. Kwame Nkrumah for an alert of thoughts against Nkrumah's leadership plans. The incident brought a split of the UGCC leadership with Kwame Nkrumah having to found his own Convention People's Party (CPP) in June 1949 for the aim of self-governance for the African people, dubbed "Self-government now". A non-violent campaign of protest and strikes were organised by Kwame Nkrumah in 1950 in achievement of his goal. But riot led to the second arrest of Kwame Nkrumah. The colony's general election brought a big win to the Convention People's Party in the absence of Kwame Nkrumah, leading to the release of Kwame Nkrumah from prison to join in governance of the country. Osagyefo Dr. Kwame Nkrumah then became the Prime Minister of the Gold Coast in 1952. In a vote of the 1956 direct vote of all the electorate members, the British Togoland voted to join the Gold Coast in the campaign for preparations towards independence. The Togo and Gold Coast territories attained independence from colonial rule in 1957 under the supreme willpower of Kwame Nkrumah. The name for the country Ghana was then adopted.

The years of independence of the Gold Coast started in 1957 with the new name of the country of Ghana emerged. Independence was granted and announced by the then Osagyefo Dr. Kwame Nkrumah who led the struggle for independence. With Osagyefo Dr. Kwame Nkrumah as the first President of Ghana, Ghana became a Republic within the Commonwealth of Nations on 1 July 1960.

Theodosia Okoh (The national flag's designer) 

Theodosia Salome Abena Kumea Okoh was a renowned Ghanaian artist who has contested and showcased her artistic internationally. She joined the Ghana Hockey Association (GHA) and worked in the role of a chairperson. She was also a patron of the Sports Writer's Association of Ghana (SWAG).

Purpose and use of the Ghanaian national flag 

The purpose of the Ghanaian national flag was to have a symbol of jubilations during the post-independence era. There were many flags ensemble for Ghana's use. Notably is the Ghanaian national flag described which has been use for many purposes as in national and international celebrations, such as the Independence Day celebration, commemoration of Ghana's big six and past leaders of the nations. The flag is raised up flying in the sky to grace glorious occasions while it is usually lowered to fly half way to show some kind of misfortune that may have hit on the country.

National ensign

Under terms of section 183 of Ghana's Merchant Shipping Act of 1963, the civil ensign is a red flag with the national flag in a black-fimbriated canton. In 2003, a new merchant shipping act was enacted, however, and this simply provides that "the National Flag of Ghana" is the proper national colours for Ghanaian ships.  No mention is made of other flags or other possible flags.

The naval ensign is a red St. George's Cross on white flag, with the national flag in canton.

Air force ensign and civil air ensign

The Ghana Air Force has its own ensign that incorporates the flag of Ghana. Civil aviation in Ghana is represented by the national civil air ensign. It is a standard light-blue field with the Ghanaian flag in the canton. It is charged in the fly with either a red, yellow and green roundel (in the case of the military ensign) or black five-pointed star (in the case of the civil ensign). Both have been used since Independence in 1957, and the subsequent founding of the Ghana Air Force in 1959.

History

The Ghanaian government flag, adopted in 1957, was flown until 1962. Similarly, when the country formed the Union of African States, the flag of the Union was modeled on Bolivia's flag, but with two black stars, representing the nations. In May 1959, a third star was added.

Following the January 1964 constitutional referendum, Ghana adopted a variant of the 1957 tricolour with white in the place of yellow, after the colours of Kwame Nkrumah's ruling and then-sole legal party Convention People's Party, making it similar to the flag of Hungary. The original 1957 flag was reinstated in February 1966 following Nkrumah's overthrow in the February 1966 coup d'état.

When the flag was changed in 1964, popular public demand upon the remembrance of Ghana's rich history agitated for the nation to revert to its use of the original Ghanaian national flag with the red, gold and green colour. The original Ghana national flag which was used in 1957 upon Ghana's independence was reinstated for use in 1966. Ghana was then one of the first countries to adopt the Pan African colours originally used in the Ethiopian flag.

References

External links

Armed Forces of Ghana Colours 

Ghana
National symbols of Ghana
Ghana
Ghana